Gulf of ‘Agig or Khalig ‘Agig, also spelled ʿAqīq or Akik, is a body of water on the coastline of Sudan on the Red Sea. It has been designated as a protected Ramsar site since 2009.

Geography
The Gulf of ‘Agig is northeast-facing and is located 160 km to the southeast of Port Sudan. It has small islands on its eastern side, The ‘Amarāt Islands close to its mouth, and the smaller Hayyis Wa Karai Islands on its southwestern part, close to the shore.

References

Bays of the Red Sea
Bodies of water of Sudan
Ramsar sites in Sudan
Bays of Africa